University of Northern Pennsylvania was a university in Bethany, Pennsylvania that operated from 1850 to 1857.

The university was chartered in May 1848 and opened on December 2, 1850.   In the fall of 1854, the Wyoming Annual Conference of the Methodist Episcopal Church assumed the running of the school.  Two years later, it was purchased by former principal John F. Stoddard.  It was destroyed by fire on April 18, 1857 and the school never reopened.

References

Defunct private universities and colleges in Pennsylvania
1850 establishments in Pennsylvania
1857 disestablishments in Pennsylvania